Pholiota variicystis is a species of fungus in the family Strophariaceae. It is a plant pathogen that infects apricots.

See also
List of Pholiota species

References

Fungi described in 1994
Fungal tree pathogens and diseases
Stone fruit tree diseases
Strophariaceae